National Highway 509 (NH 509) is a National Highway in India entirely within the state of Uttar Pradesh.

Route
 Hathras
 Aligarh
 Dibai
 Babrala
 Bahjoi
 Chandausi

See also
 List of National Highways in India (by Highway Number)
 List of National Highways in India
 National Highways Development Project

References

External links
NH 509 on OpenStreetMap

National Highways in Uttar Pradesh
National highways in India
Transport in Agra
Moradabad district